Peringome is a town in Kannur district in the Indian state of Kerala. It is 60 km north-east of Kannur town.

Demographics
 India census, Peringome had a population of 13261 with 6388 males and 6873 females.

Education
 Government College, Peringome
 Government ITI, Peringome

References

Villages near Payyanur